Phish is an American rock band formed in 1983, dissolved in 2004, and reunited in 2009. It is one of the most successful live acts in popular music history, forging a popularity in concert far greater than their album sales, radio airplay, or music video presence would otherwise indicate. Phish, at the peak of their popularity in the mid- to late 1990s, consistently ranked as one of the highest-grossing concert tours in the world.

Known for its improvisational style, rarely playing a song the same way twice, the band also never played the same set list twice in three decades and more than 1,700 shows. Many Phish fans attend multiple nights on a particular tour, much like sports fans buying season tickets, since each concert will be different.

Phish is also known for allowing fans to record the concerts and distribute the recordings.  Guitarist Trey Anastasio considered it "free advertising" since it enabled the band's music to be distributed and traded all over the United States and, eventually, the rest of the world.

The band has a Halloween tradition of "Musical Costumes", when Phish performs an entire album by a different band or artist. Occasionally, the band have debuted their own new material during these Halloween performances (2013, 2018, and 2021).

1980s

1983 
Phish formed in the fall of 1983 at the University of Vermont with co-founders Trey Anastasio and Jeff Holdsworth on guitars, Jon Fishman on drums, and Mike Gordon on bass.

Many speculate that the band played at least two shows under the name Blackwood Convention in 1983, but this stated untrue by Anastasio in 2019.  At this point, the band only played other artists' material, including Creedence Clearwater Revival, Wilson Pickett, the Who, and the Grateful Dead.

1984 
Phish took a brief hiatus during the first part of 1984 after Anastasio was suspended from UVM. The band continued with live performances when Anastasio returned to the university in the fall, at which point they became officially known as Phish.  For many concerts, Phish was joined by Marc Daubert on percussion and, on occasion, the Dude of Life on vocals.  For years, the band's performance from 1 December 1984, was their earliest live circulated recording, though a recording of a performance at UVM's Slade Hall, from 3 November 1984 eventually surfaced. The band debuted many original songs that fall, including "Makisupa Policeman", "Slave to the Traffic Light", "Camel Walk", "Skippy the Wondermouse", and "Fluffhead." All of these songs, with the exception of "Skippy the Wondermouse" (whose music was later used for "McGrupp and the Watchful Hosemasters"), have remained in the band's live rotation for the duration of their career.

1985 
In the spring of 1985, the band met keyboardist Page McConnell, a student at Goddard College who jammed with the band for a portion of their May 3, 1985 show on the campus of the University of Vermont. By September 26, he was a member of the band.

The band's shows during this period featured much improvisation, much of which revolved around new originals and cover songs from the Grateful Dead. Mike Gordon has often cited the band's November 23 show from Goddard College as a religious experience and the musical highlight of his career.

Trey Anastasio and Jon Fishman traveled to Europe during the summer and wrote a great deal of the band's early material on the trip.

More originals began to make their way into Phish's concert repertoire, including "McGrupp and the Watchful Hosemasters", "Anarchy", "Alumni Blues", "Dear Mrs. Reagan", "Dog Log", "Prep School Hippie" "Dave's Energy Guide", "Letter To Jimmy Page", and the popular classics "Harry Hood", "Run Like an Antelope", "Mike's Song", and "Possum".

1986
In May 1986, Jeff Holdsworth quit the band; he was not replaced. Holdsworth's retirement solidified the band's classic four-man lineup of Trey Anastasio, Page McConnell, Mike Gordon, and Jon Fishman, which remained unchanged for the rest of their career.

In October, Paul Languedoc officially joined the band as sound engineer. He remained with the band until the breakup in 2004. A luthier by trade, Languedoc built all of the electric guitars that Trey would use throughout his career, as well as a number of bass guitars for Gordon.

Later that month, the band played the first of four consecutive annual Halloween shows at Goddard College.

Phish continued to perform a greater number of concerts in 1986, debuting a wealth of new material throughout the year, including "You Enjoy Myself", "AC/DC Bag", "Golgi Apparatus", "Lushington", "Sanity", "David Bowie", "Wilson", "Icculus", "I Am Hydrogen", "Halley's Comet", and many other future Phish classics.

The band also began circulating The White Tape, their first studio project, consisting of band performances as well as solo recordings by Anastasio and Gordon. While this recording circulated in the fan community for a number of years, it was not officially released until 1998, at which point the album became officially known as Phish.

1987
In 1987, Phish was winding down their college career and preparing to take their live performances to the next level. The band became fixtures at Nectar's during this year, playing three-night-stands, of three sets each night, on an almost monthly basis. Phish continued playing college campuses and parties during this year, and spent the majority of their down-time practicing, and honing their craft.

In the spring of 1987, Trey Anastasio submitted Phish's studio experiment, The Man Who Stepped Into Yesterday, as his senior thesis at Goddard College. Many of these songs would make more frequent appearances in concert throughout the year. While this recording was never officially released, it is commonly traded throughout the community and many of the songs from this project, such as "Wilson", "AC/DC Bag", and "The Lizards", went on to become all-time Phish classics.

A wealth of original songs made their first known appearances in 1987, including "The Divided Sky", "Fee", "The Curtain With", "Harpua", "Flat Fee", "Big Black Furry Creature From Mars", "I Didn't Know", "The Man Who Stepped Into Yesterday", "Fuck Your Face", "Suzy Greenberg", "Dinner and a Movie", "The Sloth", and a quirky tune called "Punch Me in the Eye" which, while completely unrelated and only performed once, served as inspiration for "Punch You in the Eye" debuting two years later.

1988
In 1988, Phish began touring outside of the Vermont area, performing concerts in New York, Colorado, Pennsylvania, Massachusetts, and other states throughout the year. In March, the band unveiled the first complete performance of The Man Who Stepped Into Yesterday. After seeing their March 12 concert, manager John Paluska booked Phish for a concert at Amherst College in Massachusetts at The Zoo co-op house at Amherst College. He would go on to manage the band until their 2004 breakup.

Musically, Phish was concentrating on large scale composition throughout most of 1988 (much of which appeared on their classic double album Junta), with multi-part suites and epics acting as centerpieces of the band's live setlists. Many of these extended pieces, including reworked older songs such as "You Enjoy Myself", "The Divided Sky" and "David Bowie", also featured lengthy improvisational excursions.

The band's original repertoire continued to grow, with complex pieces such as "Esther", "Foam", "The Lizards", "Colonel Forbin's Ascent", and "Fly Famous Mockingbird" making their debut along with future favorites "Tela", "Weekapaug Groove", "No Dogs Allowed", and "Contact."

1989
By 1989, Phish was on the road full-time after three of the band's four members had graduated from college (Mike Gordon graduated the following year). The year saw Phish aggressively covering the concert circuit in the Northeast United States, especially on college campuses, where the band found their most dedicated followers. The band's fanbase kept on growing as many fans travelled from state to state and concert to concert, attending multiple nights in a row as Phish continued to change their setlists on a nightly basis.

Phish also unveiled their most ambitious piece to date, the multi-part epic "Reba", as well as other complex and intricately composed songs such as "Split Open and Melt", "Kung", "Bathtub Gin", "The Oh Kee Pa Ceremony", "My Sweet One", "In a Hole", and "The Mango Song." Improvisation seemed to take a backseat to composition for Phish in 1989, a trend that would continue for the next three years. Throughout the year, the band recorded tracks for their fourth studio project Lawn Boy.

Legendary lighting designer Chris Kuroda officially joined Phish on March 30 of the year and would remain with the band through the rest of their career, going on to pioneer new techniques and set new standards in the concert lighting industry.

1990s

1990
Phish entered the 1990s as a national touring act, performing coast to coast across the United States. The band teamed up with friends Widespread Panic, Blues Traveler, and Aquarium Rescue Unit for various concerts in an effort to spread their music to new audiences, and toured non-stop for the first six months of the year.

Following a three-set tour-closing show at Townshend Family Park (the second of three such annual events), the band visited Wendell Studios, in Boston MA, and recorded a wealth of material. None of these recordings have been officially released but they are available online and feature renditions of several Phish classics that have never otherwise been released on a studio album, including "Harry Hood", "Mike's Song", "I Am Hydrogen", "Weekapaug Groove", "Runaway Jim", and "Suzy Greenberg", as well as a couple of jazz standards, and other original songs.

Aside from a few isolated appearances, Phish did not tour in the summer of 1990 but remained busy, practicing several hours a day and performing a weekly set at a local jazz club, billed as the "Johnny B. Fishman Jazz Ensemble". Featuring the members of Phish, along with what would eventually become known as the Giant Country Horns, the band honed their playing on a number of jazz standards, many of which would become a part of the band's live show for the next few years.

Original songs debuted in 1990 include "Stash", "The Squirming Coil", "Buried Alive", "Bouncing Around the Room", "Magilla", "Destiny Unbound", "Don't Get Me Wrong" (a collaboration with John Popper), "Eliza", "Runaway Jim", "Tweezer", "Cavern", "Horn", "Tube", "The Landlady", "The Asse Festival", "Gumbo", "Llama", and the original arrangement of "Rift."

1991
Like the year before, Phish performed throughout 1991 all over the United States, visiting almost every state in the country. The band's dedicated fanbase continued to grow. With no radio, TV, or mainstream press coverage, this growth was based solely on word of mouth. Fans of the band launched Phish.Net, one of the first Internet websites in popular music. The site connected the band and fans from all over the country and helped spread the word about upcoming concerts, setlists, and band history. It would be a few years before the band started their official website, phish.com, but phish.net remained active throughout the band's career.

Phish made the leap into the big leagues in 1991 when they signed a deal with Elektra Records, after releasing their first two albums independently. They would remain with the label until their 2004 breakup. In the midst of their touring schedule, they found time to record their major label debut, A Picture of Nectar, at White Crow Studios, in Burlington VT. Released the following year, the album featured versions of concert staples such as "Stash", "Tweezer", and "Chalk Dust Torture", among others.

1991 also saw Phish record an album with longtime associate, the Dude of Life, titled Crimes Of the Mind. The Dude, who had previously lent his writing skill to classic Phish songs such as "Suzy Greenberg" and "Fluffhead", wrote the songs on the album and provided vocals while Phish performed the music. The Dude Of Life would occasionally appear on stage with Phish, to perform this material, most notably at Amy's Farm (see below). Upon Phish's surge in popularity, this was released on Elektra Records in 1994.

Summer 1991 featured Phish touring with a horn section for the first and only time in their career. The Giant Country Horns, made up primarily of local Burlington musicians, featured on the majority of Phish's sets during this tour, utilizing both pre-written charts as well as factoring into the improvisational segments. This horn section, or a variation, would occasionally make one-off appearances with Phish in the years to come, and would eventually serve as the inspiration, and basis, for the horns in Anastasio's solo band.

Most notably, Phish also held their first official concert festival – Amy's Farm – held in upstate Maine at the horse farm of longtime fan Amy Skelton. It was a free show and, like many of their future festivals, was an outdoor camp out that closed the band's summer tour. Phish would go on to host three more summer festivals in Maine.

Fall 1991 saw Phish touring with great intensity, from coast to coast and back again, culminating in their third consecutive New Year's Eve show, and the first to run for three sets.

Original song debuts in 1991 included "Guelah Papyrus", "Chalk Dust Torture", "Setting Sail", "Poor Heart", "Brother", "It's Ice", "Sparkle", "All Things Reconsidered", and "Glide."

1992
1992 saw Phish continue to tour intensively, all over the United States, and even enjoy their first taste of Europe. The year's live activity kicked off on 6 March, in Portsmouth NH, with a significant amount of new material. This show also featured the band clueing the audience in on their "secret language", which is a series of musical cues and signals that the band would use to communicate with one another. While this had been happening on stage for a couple of years at this point, new signals were devised to include the audience, such as the Homer Simpson "D'oh!" signal, the "turn turn turn" signal, the "aw fuck!" signal, and several others. A handful of shows early in the tour featured Trey instructing the audience on what to look out for (with the correct assumption that tape trading would effectively spread the word), and those signals featured heavily in the various jams and song intros during this year.

Another bit of audience participation premiered this year in the form of the "Big Ball Jam", where three giant beach balls would be unleashed into the audience. Each of the melodic performers would follow one particular ball and provide musical accompaniment as it would make its journey around the venue, and back towards the stage. While this often resulted in a chaotic, discordant jam, this quickly became a popular fixture of Phish shows and remained a part of their act for a few years, before the venues got to be too big.

Phish ventured to Europe for the first time in June, touring for about two weeks as an opener for Violent Femmes as well as making appearances at the famed Roskilde Festival, and a festival appearance at Brixton Academy.

Returning Stateside, Phish spent the rest of their summer playing their own shows, headlining several dates on the H.O.R.D.E. tour, and spending a couple of months touring as an opening act for Santana.

After taking time off in September and October to record the concept album Rift, Phish embarked on a busy November and December, touring the eastern half of the United States, along with two Canadian dates. After a brief break, Phish reconvened for their first four-night Holiday run, culminating in a legendary New Year's show in Boston that was broadcast live on WBCN. Taking advantage of this, Phish heavily utilized their "secret language", including many new signals, which were explained on flyers that were distributed to fans as they entered, the purpose being to confuse any radio listener who is not in the "know".

Original songs debuted in 1992 include "Maze", "My Friend, My Friend", "Mound", "NICU", "Sleeping Monkey", the new arrangement of "Rift", "The Horse", "Silent in the Morning", "Weigh", "Axilla", "Fast Enough for You", "Big Ball Jam", "Faht", "Catapult", "Buffalo Bill", and "Lengthwise."

1993
In February, Phish released their second concept album, Rift, and immediately hit the road for six months of nonstop touring at venues all over the United States. As the year progressed, the venues got larger, especially in the northeast, where they performed at major summer sheds such as Jones Beach, Great Woods, and Darien Lake (all of which the band continues to visit). Phish also visited a large number of college campuses, theatres, a handful of clubs in smaller markets, and headlined a select number of dates on the H.O.R.D.E. tour.

For the first time in their career, Phish did not tour at all in the fall, instead retreating to Los Angeles to record Hoist with producer Paul Fox and a host of special guests.

Phish capped off 1993 with a four-show New Year's run. For these shows, the band performed on a stage that was designed as an aquarium. At the turn of the new year, the band's traditional version of "Auld Lang Syne" segued into the end jam from the yet-to-be-performed "Down With Disease". Footage from this performance, utilizing the stage set, was featured in Mike Gordon's video for "Down With Disease", released the following spring.

With the intention of not road-testing the majority of material for their next album, original song debuts in 1993 were very slim, featuring only "Sample in a Jar", "Lifeboy", "The Wedge", and the short-lived instrumental, "Leprechaun."

Box office score data

1994
The band was now a major live touring act, accomplishing such milestones as selling out both Madison Square Garden and Boston Garden, making their national television debut on the Late Show with David Letterman, earning radio play and an MTV music video with the song "Down With Disease" from their album Hoist, and beginning their Halloween "musical costume" tradition (where the band would perform an entire album by a different band). Additionally, the band's audience was growing by huge numbers, making Phish second only to the Grateful Dead with respect to the live concert cultural phenomenon that surrounded both bands.

After performing two of their albums in concert at a show in Charleston, West Virginia on June 26 (The Man Who Stepped Into Yesterday and Hoist), the band jokingly bragged backstage that they could play any album at any time. Taking the idea to the next level, the band promised to play a complete album by another band on Halloween night, taking fan votes by mail. The winning album was the legendary White Album from the Beatles. Several bands would borrow this tradition in years to come, most notably Dream Theater, whose drummer, Mike Portnoy, is an admitted Phish fan.

Several of the year's highlights were compiled to form A Live One, the band's first live album, which would be released the following year.

Phish spent a week in November 1994 touring with the Rev. Jeff Mosier, who gave the band a crash course in traditional bluegrass playing. They would hone their skills on the bus and in band practice, learning several new tunes along the way, and Mosier would join the band onstage each night for a few numbers. After one such show, on 19 November in Bloomington IN, the band & Mosier gave an impromptu performance outside of their tour bus. Recordings of this have circulated in trading circles since the occasion. Home video footage of the entire crash course was edited into a documentary which circulates in the fan community as well.

1994 also featured the first home-video release by Phish. Tracking was filmed and edited by Mike Gordon and features footage of the band in the studio recording Hoist.

Once again, Phish capped off 1994 with a four-show Holiday Run, culminating in a legendary performance at Boston Garden, which featured the first appearance of the flying hot dog, in which the band rode, as it flew over the heads of the crowd before the stroke of midnight. The hot dog would go on to make two more appearances at Phish events and currently resides in the Rock & Roll Hall Of Fame museum.

Original song debuts in 1994 included "Scent of a Mule", "If I Could", "Wolfman's Brother", "Julius", "Demand", "Dog-Faced Boy", "Guyute", "Axilla (Part 2)", "Simple" and "Down with Disease".

Costumes
On Halloween 1994, Phish performed the Beatles' White Album. The band played every song on the double album except "Good Night", which was played over the P.A. at the end of the set ("Birthday" was covered as an instrumental, during which Fishman presented a birthday cake to Brad Sands, the band's road manager).

Before the band took the stage for their second set, the sound technician began playing "Speak to Me" over the PA, leading the audience to believe the band was about to play Pink Floyd's The Dark Side of the Moon. However, just at the moment "Breathe" would have begun, the recording immediately cut to a sample of Ed Sullivan introducing the Beatles from their famous February 9, 1964, appearance on his show. The band promptly leapt into "Back in the U.S.S.R."

Phish returned to the stage after the White Album set, and Anastasio began by playing the opening riff to "Custard Pie", the first track on Physical Graffiti by Led Zeppelin, leading some concert-goers to believe that the band would be donning two musical costumes that evening.  However, the riff was only a tease, and Phish proceeded to play a third set of primarily original songs.

The show included a Halloween costume contest of audience members and Jon Fishman playing on a vacuum cleaner and gracing the stage in the nude during "Revolution 9". The show reportedly ended past 3:30 a.m. on November 1, 1994.

The show has been released in its entirety as Live Phish Volume 13.

1994 warm-up and support shows

1994 dates

Box office score data

1995
For the first time since 1987, the band took an extensive vacation for the first four and a half months of the year, finally returning in May for the only politically based concert of their entire career – a Voters for Choice benefit concert conceived by Gloria Steinem. The majority of that show featured debuts of brand new songs, many of which would remain in the band's rotation for the duration of their career. In spite of that, Phish received mixed reviews for participating in the concert, and never participated in partisan events again.

The band headlined amphitheaters in the summer of 1995 as their first official live album – A Live One – became the first Phish album to receive gold record status. The album, released on June 28 and featuring a number of highlights from the band's 1994 tours, became the group's most successful album to date. The band was now the premier live touring band in the United States, and the group's fall tour featured several sold-out concerts in large arenas.

That fall, Phish challenged its audience to two games of chess. Each show on the tour featured a pair of moves. The band took its turn either at the beginning of or during the first set. The audience was invited to gather at the Greenpeace table during the setbreak to determine its move. Two games were played on the tour. The audience conceded the first game on November 15 in Florida, and the band conceded the second game at its New Year's Eve concert at Madison Square Garden. These were the only two games that were played, which left the final score tied at 1-1. 

In their tradition of playing a well-known album by another band for Halloween, Phish contracted a full horn section for their performance of the Who's Quadrophenia in 1995. On New Year's Eve, the band performed what is considered one of their greatest concerts ever – a three-set marathon performance at Madison Square Garden. The show was later released in its entirety in 2005 to commemorate its tenth anniversary. The show was also named one of the greatest concerts of the 1990s by Rolling Stone magazine.

On 22 November, Phish performed their first of many legendary shows at Hampton Coliseum. This show featured the first "rotation jam", where each member of the band would take over for the player on their right, in the midst of an unbroken jam, until the entire band were performing on instruments other than their own. This rotation culminated with all four members performing simultaneously on McConnell's keyboards. While not becoming a concert staple, Phish would occasionally explore the rotation jam in years to come.

Original song debuts included "Spock's Brain", "Theme From the Bottom", "Ha Ha Ha", "Taste", "Free", "Strange Design", "Glide II", "Prince Caspian", "Acoustic Army", "Keyboard Army", "Cars Trucks Buses, and "The Fog That Surrounds", which featured the music from "Taste" with all-new lyrics, written and sung by Fishman. The two versions would eventually be merged into the final version of "Taste".

Costumes

Although the band performed the Who's Quadrophenia for Halloween 1995, the voting reportedly ended differently. Frank Zappa's album Joe's Garage got the most votes, but the album's complex overdubs, potentially offensive lyrics, and several tunes that Zappa had requested never be performed live again (such as "Watermelon in Easter Hay"), caused the band to perform Quadrophenia with a horn section instead (which reportedly came in second in the voting)

Later in the night during the band's third set, "You Enjoy Myself" was performed for over forty minutes. The band ended the night with "My Generation", a song made famous by the Who but not included on their Quadrophenia album.  The band destroyed their instruments at the end of the encore, just as the Who did decades before.

The show has been released in its entirety as Live Phish Volume 14.

1995 warm-up and support shows

1995 dates

Box office score data

1996
While taking the first half of 1996 off to begin recording a new studio album, Phish made two one-off live appearances in the spring. First was the band headlining at the 1996 New Orleans Jazz and Heritage Festival in April. The second was a surprise club appearance under the name "Third Ball" at a small club in Woodstock, New York, just miles from Bearsville Studios where Phish was finishing their new album.

That summer, the band once again toured Europe with Santana for the first time in four years. These dates would be the last time Phish toured with another act on the bill. By August, the band was finally back in the US for a brief summer tour that saw most of the shows sold out well in advance. The band also began performing multiple nights at certain venues, such as Indiana's Deer Creek Music Center (where Phish's August 13 show was released as Live Phish 12) and Colorado's Red Rocks Amphitheatre. Phish's audience had grown so much that the enormous influx of Phish fans to the town of Morrison, Colorado, resulted in Phish being banned for 10 years from playing Red Rocks.

Phish was so popular that the band drew 70,000 to a decommissioned air force base in remote Plattsburgh, New York for a two-day Phish festival called The Clifford Ball. It was the largest rock concert of the year. Phish played seven sets over two days, one of which featured a jam atop a flatbed truck cruising through the campground in the middle of the night. The second day featured a symphony orchestra performing classical music in the mid-afternoon. MTV made a documentary of the experience. The Clifford Ball was the first weekend-long festival hosted by Phish throughout their career.  The event took place on August 16 and 17, 1996, at the former Plattsburgh Air Force Base in Plattsburgh, New York, about one hour west from Phish's home base of Burlington, Vermont. The event was named after Clifford Ball, a man who held events for aviators such as Amelia Earhart. The Clifford Ball was a proposed name for the 1990s traveling festival that ultimately was named H.O.R.D.E.

The name Clifford Ball had been known to the band for some five years before The Clifford Ball took place.  According to Phish Manager, John Paluska, "The band was walking through the airport in Pittsburgh one day, and they came upon a small, little plaque of a guy named Clifford Ball... it said 'Clifford Ball: a beacon of light in the world of flight.' ...they just thought the [expression] was the funniest idea for a show..."

The event combined overhead flights by bombers, fighters, gliders, and various other aerial vehicles with carnival rides, jugglers, and men on stilts.  Three gigantic video screens and four sound towers were erected to amplify the band.  Phish, the marquee band who headlined the event, were joined by a classical violin quartet, a blues quartet, a choral quintet, and guitar soloists.  The "Clifford Ball Orchestra" performed an afternoon set of pieces by Debussy, Ravel, and Stravinsky. Phish performed seven sets of music over the two nights, including a late night set on a flatbed truck that rolled through the parking lot in the wee hours of the morning.

70,000 people attended, making the event Phish's largest concert up to that point and the largest rock concert in the United States in that year. The audience was four times the size of surrounding city of Plattsburgh, making Plattsburgh the ninth most-populous city in New York that weekend, and adding $20 million into the local economy. Despite the size of the concert, it received very little coverage from the mainstream media. MTV aired a documentary of the experience, using footage from Phish's production company, Dionysian Productions. Phish released a seven-DVD box set on March 3, 2009, chronicling the band's seven sets and including bonus documentary footage.

In October, the band released their long-awaited, commercially successful studio album Billy Breathes. That fall, the band headlined major arenas and covered Remain in Light by the Talking Heads at their 1996 Halloween show at The Omni in Atlanta. The performance of the groove-based album, which was influenced by funk and African polyrhythms, was cited by band members as a major influence on the group's stylistic change in 1997 and beyond.

Original song debuts included "Waste", "Character Zero", "Train Song", "Talk", "Swept Away", and "Steep"

Costumes
For their third musical costume, Phish's rendition of the Talking Heads' Remain in Light lasted 62 minutes and 16 seconds (compared to the Talking Heads's original, at under 45 minutes; elsewhere reported as 54:12), and featured a horn section and Santana percussionist Karl Perazzo.

The show has been released in its entirety as Live Phish Volume 15.

1996 warm-up and support shows

1996 dates

Box office score data

1997
1997 proved to be the band's most prolific songwriting period, as no less than 20 new originals were debuted in concert throughout the year. This year also marked a major shift in the band's sound and style, where improvisation became more prevalent than ever, focusing heavily on funk and groove, with rapid-fire guitar solos taking a back seat. It would not be uncommon to see the band's setlists feature five titles, or less, while still running 90 minutes or more. Traditional "jam" numbers were taken to new extremes while other songs that were not previously utilized as improvisational springboards, such as "Tube", "AC/DC Bag", and "Halley's Comet", were explored to great effect. The band's Worcester show on 29 November featured a version of "Runaway Jim", to kick off the second set, which lasted 58 minutes – the longest "song" performance of their career.

The band headlined a winter tour of Europe in February and March. Excerpts from the 1 March show at Markthalle in Hamburg were later released as the live album Slip Stitch and Pass. Before embarking on their summer tour of the United States, they returned to Europe in June and July for a series of concerts that focused heavily on brand-new material. Most of these shows were headlining gigs, but there were a number of festival dates including a return to Roskilde and the band's only appearance at the famed Glastonbury Festival. The band's 6 July performance in Desenzano, Italy, is notable in that the band's afternoon soundcheck was open to the public and became a performance in itself, with one-off songs and jams, audience requests, audience karaoke (with the band backing them up), and even a limbo contest on stage.

Phish returned to the United States in July for a month-long summer tour of sold out amphitheaters, culminating in another huge festival – The Great Went – held in remote Limestone, Maine in the upper northeastern corner of the US. 70,000 fans attended the festival, which once again included seven sets of music from Phish over two days (one of which was a late night "disco set" with all four members on keyboards). The Great Went was the sequel to The Clifford Ball, taking place on August 16 and 17, 1997, close to the Canada–US border at the Loring Air Force Base in Limestone, Maine. The event was named after a quote from the movie Twin Peaks: Fire Walk with Me.

The world's largest fire truck hosed down thousands of fans as they arrived Saturday morning, and on Sunday morning, approximately 1,100 people posed nude as part of a fifty-state tour by photographer Spencer Tunick.  Throughout the weekend, the members of the audience each painted their own individual piece of art. The resultant pieces of fan artwork were attached to one another to create a tower that was eventually several stories high. The band also created their own piece of art during a jam on the final night. Later that evening, the band passed their artwork through the audience. To create a connection between audience and band, the band's artwork was attached to the fan artwork. As seen in Bittersweet Motel, a giant matchstick was lit, burning the tower to the ground.

Phish was the only band that played the main stage, performing seven sets of music over two nights, including a late night disco set at 2:30 AM featuring all four members on keyboards.  The Bangor Symphony Orchestra performed Debussy and Stravinsky during the afternoon of the second day, accompanied by a glider pilot who soared above the audience. During Phish's performance of "Vultures," a couple from Putnam, Connecticut, Terry Moggio and Maggie Loobadeery, exchanged wedding vows on the concert grounds in a ceremony executed by local favorite Stick Treadgood.

75,000 people attended, making the event Phish's largest concert up to that point, and the top-grossing rock concert in the United States in the summer of 1997. Fans camped out onsite in tents, making Limestone the largest city in Maine over the weekend.

During the summer tour, film director Todd Phillips began filming a documentary of the band titled Bittersweet Motel that would finally hit theaters in 2000.

On 7 November, Phish made their first appearance on Late Night With Conan O'Brien, to promote Slip Stitch And Pass, with all four members of the band sporting beards. Rather than performing a track from the album, or another well known tune, they unveiled a brand new song called "Farmhouse". It would be quite some time before this song made it into the band's regular rotation, making this performance a relative anomaly.

Following their Conan appearance, Phish embarked on a November/December tour that saw them further exploring dark, groove-based improvisation (dubbed by fans as "cow funk"), with songs stretched out to previously unheard lengths. This tour culminated in a four-show holiday run, including three sold-out shows at Madison Square Garden.

Original song debuts in 1997 included "Walfredo", "Rock-a-William", "Dogs Stole Things", "Carini", "Twist", "Limb by Limb", "Piper", "Vultures", "Ghost", "Olivia's Pool", "Water in the Sky", "Wading in the Velvet Sea", "I Don't Care", "Saw it Again", "Bye Bye Foot", "Dirt", "Meatstick", "Black-Eyed Katy", "Waking Up", and "Farmhouse."

1997 warmup and support shows

1997 dates

Box office score data

1998
Whenever Phish was off the road in 1997, the group worked on a new studio project that continued into the early months of 1998. Feeling a bit restless, the band took a few days off in April to play The Island Tour. The tour consisted of two shows on Long Island, New York, and two shows in Providence, Rhode Island. These shows continued the "cow funk" vibe of the previous year, featuring long, spaced-out funk jams and a number of new-song debuts, including the soon-to-be-classic, "Birds Of A Feather". All four shows were released as live albums.

Phish briefly toured Europe in July before returning to the United States for another month-long summer tour. The dark grooves of the previous year and the Island Tour, had somewhat subsided by this point, and Phish had begun to settle into a new style that, while still relying heavily on improvisation, was far less murky.

On August 1, Phish began debuting a brand new cover song at nearly every show, starting with "Ramble On" by Led Zeppelin at a show at Alpine Valley in East Troy, Wisconsin. Covers by Cole Porter, Smashing Pumpkins, Van Halen, the Velvet Underground, Allen Toussaint and the Beastie Boys, followed by a rendition of the Grateful Dead's Terrapin Station as the band stopped in Virginia Beach on August 9, the third anniversary of the death of Jerry Garcia. These were in addition to covers by Ween, Corneille, 2Pac, Los Lobos, Johnny Winter, Dry Bread, ZZ Top (x2), the Who (x2), Marvin Gaye, Son Seals, the Blues Brothers, the Rolling Stones (x2), Edgar Winter, Led Zeppelin (not Ramble On), Jimi Hendrix (x2), Neil Young, Robert Palmer, Steve Earle, Talking Heads (x2), Jane's Addiction, Richard Strauss, Stevie Wonder, Syd Barrett, Neil Diamond, Bob Marley, Little Feat, B.B. King, Blues Image and Henry Mancini at points throughout the tour as well. Phish had been relentlessly compared to the Dead throughout their career and often cited as the apparent heir to the Dead's throne, resulting in Phish making a strong effort to distance themselves from the Dead. The band had not performed a Grateful Dead song in concert since April 1, 1986 – twelve years earlier – when they were a five-man college band that had yet to play outside of Vermont. For the encore in Virginia Beach, Phish performed the Dead's multi-part suite "Terrapin Station". Former members of the Grateful Dead extended a "thank you" to Phish in their quarterly newsletter. A few months later, Dead bassist Phil Lesh reached out to Trey Anastasio and Page McConnell to join him, former Dead vocalist Donna Jean Godchaux and others to perform three nights of Dead and Phish music in April 1999. Members of Phish and the Dead now have a strong relationship, with Trey having played guitar in the Dead's 50th anniversary "Fare Thee Well" lineup, and bands such as Rhythm Devils and SerialPod containing members of both bands.

The band finished their summer tour with another huge festival in Maine called The Lemonwheel. 60,000 people attended and the band played seven sets over two nights, including an instrumental set of ambient music surrounded by candles made by fans throughout the weekend. Lemonwheel was the third festival hosted by the band, taking place on August 15 and 16, 1998, again at Loring Air Force Base in Limestone, Maine.  60,000 people attended creating a community of fans that, again, made Limestone one of the largest cities in Maine over the weekend.

Phish was the only band to play the main stage, performing seven sets of music over two nights.  Several other bands, including Keller Williams and Manic Mule, played in the sidestage. The concert grounds, shaped like a large figure 8, contained several beer gardens, a Ferris wheel, an elephant, jugglers, and stiltsmen.  At the festival, the audience made candles throughout the weekend. Saturday night's fourth set included an hour-long ambient jam on a dark stage covered in hundreds of homemade candles.  On Sunday, the night ended with the band lighting fuses onstage, burning a path through the stage and activating a large elephant that sprayed a gusher of water into the air from its trunk, and then slowly made its way through the audience to the tune of "Baby Elephant Walk"

In October, Phish performed at the annual Farm Aid festival, jamming onstage with Neil Young, Willie Nelson, Paul Shaffer, and others. After an unannounced show at The Fillmore, in San Francisco, Phish appeared at Neil Young's annual Bridge School Benefit, performing two nights in a rare acoustic setting, featuring several debuts, stripped-down versions of Phish classics, and onstage collaborations with Neil Young, Sarah McLachlan, and Kevin Hearn. Two days later, Phish appeared on the PBS program, Sessions At West 54th, conversing with host David Byrne and performing a set that drew heavily from their soon-to-be-released seventh studio album.

Capping off their busy-but-non-traditional October was the release of The Story of the Ghost. A relatively accurate studio representation of the "cow funk" period, much of the album was culled from hours of improvisation that took place in the studio throughout 1997 and 1998, and combined with several of the songs that had been debuted in Europe the previous year. They marked the occasion by performing "Birds Of A Feather" on Late Show With David Letterman on the day of release, before embarking on their fall tour, two days later.

On Halloween night in Las Vegas, the group performed Loaded by the Velvet Underground as their annual musical costume. Two days later, the band surprised fans by performing an unannounced rendition of Pink Floyd's The Dark Side of the Moon at a show in West Valley City, Utah. Phish continued touring throughout November, including two nights at Hampton Coliseum, which were later released as the boxed set, Hampton Comes Alive, and they capped off the year with a four-night stand at Madison Square Garden, the band's first extended run at their beloved second home.

Original song debuts in 1998 included "Birds of a Feather", "Frankie Says", "Roggae", "Shafty", "Meat", "Fikus", "Brian and Robert", "Bittersweet Motel", "The Moma Dance", "Never", "Sleep", and "Driver".

Costumes
On the second night of a two-night run in Las Vegas, including the previous night's celebration of the band's fifteenth anniversary, the band performed the Velvet Underground's Loaded.

Though many fans were unfamiliar with the album, some songs including "Rock and Roll" became concert staples and fan favorites.

The show has been released in its entirety as Live Phish Volume 16.

Fans in West Valley, Utah were treated to a surprise performance of Pink Floyd's The Dark Side of the Moon sandwiched between the banter of "Harpua" on November 2, 1998.

It is widely believed that the impetus for Phish to cover Dark Side two days after the Vegas Halloween show was that the Utah venue was relatively empty with thousands of unsold tickets while just two days prior in the neighboring state, the venue was filled to the brim with many attendees having paid well above face value and spillover fans without tickets remaining outside.

Unlike the Halloween extravaganzas, the performance has not been officially released but is currently being circulated through fan tape trading websites.

1998 warm-up and support shows

1998 dates

Box office score data

1999
Phish took the first half of 1999 off from touring and recording. Trey Anastasio embarked on his first ever solo tour in the spring, and Page McConnell compiled tracks from Phish's 1997 and 1998 recording sessions to produce The Siket Disc, an instrumental album that was released online in June (the disc would be available in stores the following year).

The band finally hit the road in the summer, embarking on another annual summer tour of the United States. Phish performed their first of two Fourth of July celebrations with a two-night stand in Atlanta. The first night featured the unveiling of "The Meatstick Dance", which would be performed by band and audience throughout the year.  Instead of throwing another huge summer festival to close out the tour, the band decided to focus all festival activities to the Millennium New Year's Eve celebration. However, at the eleventh hour, Camp Oswego took place at an airport in upstate New York. 65,000 people attended and Phish played five sets of music over two days. A number of other groups such as Ozomatli, the Del McCoury Band, and Son Seals performed on a side stage throughout the weekend.The event took place on July 17 and 18, 1999, at the Oswego County Airport in Volney, New York, a small rural upstate town. 65,000 people attended. This event, though part of 1999's normal summer tour, is officially considered and was promoted as the band's fourth festival, despite the previously announced festival in Big Cypress, Florida on December 30–31, 1999 and January 1, 2000. 
It was the fifth and largest of ten weekend-long festivals hosted by the band. The event took place on the eve of the millennium – December 30 and 31, 1999, at the Big Cypress Indian Reservation near the Big Cypress National Preserve in southern Florida. 85,000 people attended, making it the largest Millennium Eve concert on earth that night, surpassing shows by Sting, Barbra Streisand, Aerosmith, Billy Joel, Eric Clapton, Rod Stewart, The Eagles, Eminem, Jimmy Buffett, Kiss, Metallica, the Red Hot Chili Peppers, and Elton John.

In a 2000 cover story for Entertainment Weekly, three of the four Phish members declared Big Cypress to be the greatest Phish concert ever. It was also voted as the most popular Phish show ever by fans in the final volume of The Pharmer's Almanac. It was also the longest Phish concert ever, culminating in a seven-and-a-half-hour second set from midnight on New Year's Eve to sunrise New Year's Day. Phish was the only band at the event, performing five sets of music (nearly sixteen hours) over two nights. As fans left the concert area at sunrise, the Beatles' "Here Comes the Sun" played over the PA speakers. Band and audience attempted to break the world record for the largest number of people doing the same dance at one time during the song "Meatstick," but the record was not broken (representatives from the Guinness Book of World Records were on hand). The end of the summer tour saw Phish make their first journey to Japan, to perform four shows at the Fuji Rock Festival. During the summer and fall, the band adopted a number of songs performed by Trey Anastasio just months earlier on his solo tour. Many of these songs contained repetitive bass lines and techno & electronica themed improvisational excursions (with Anastasio and McConnell using a series of electronic effects), a sound that Phish would hone throughout 1999 and 2000.

1999 dates

Box office score data

2000s

2000
In the spring of 2000, the band finished up recording the new studio album Farmhouse, which featured mostly songs that had been performed onstage as far back as 1997. Anastasio was responsible for most of the album's writing and direction. In mid-May, Phish performed their first concerts at New York's Radio City Music Hall. The band underwent their most intensive promo tour, on release of Farmhouse, recording several short sets for various radio and TV programs.

In June, the band visited Japan for the second time in two years, performing a number of headlining and festival shows.  By the end of the month, Phish was back in the United States for another month-long summer tour, kicking off with a star-studded opening night in Nashville featuring appearances by Wynonna Judd, Ricky Skaggs, and the Del McCoury Band. In mid-July, Phish performed on the long-running series Austin City Limits.  For the first time since 1995, the band did not hold an annual end-of-summer festival. Additionally, for the second year in a row, Phish did not perform their annual Halloween music costume.

Towards the end of their fall tour at a webcast show that would be released on DVD as Phish: Live in Vegas, Trey Anastasio announced that the band was taking an indefinite break following the tour's end.  Therefore, for the first time since 1988, there would be no Phish New Year's Eve concert.  On October 6 & 7, the band played a two-night stand at the Shoreline Amphitheatre just outside San Francisco, which would be the band's final concerts before their indefinite hiatus. The band went their separate ways following the shows.

Phish debuted no new material in 2000, with the exception of "Guy Forget" (a song played in soundcheck since 1993).

Box office score data

2002
Phish regrouped in late 2002 with the surprise release of their ninth studio album, Round Room. While two of the songs had been previously performed by the Trey Anastasio Band, the remainder of the material was brand new. This occasion was marked by the announcement of a four-show holiday run as well as performances on Saturday Night Live and Late Show with David Letterman, each appearance featuring a performance of a different song from the album ("46 Days" and "All Of These Dreams", respectively). Additionally, the members of Phish appeared with Jimmy Fallon, Horatio Sanz, and Al Gore in a "Jerrod's Room" sketch, performing a snippet of "Contact".

The only show played this year was a New Year's Eve concert in Madison Square Garden on December 31, followed by three shows at the Hampton Coliseum in Virginia on January 2, 3, and 4.

Including their TV debuts, five songs made their first appearances this year – "46 Days", "All Of These Dreams", "Waves", "Seven Below", and "Walls of the Cave".

2003
For two years, the members of Phish concentrated on outside projects and other musical endeavors. Trey Anastasio worked with the Vermont Youth Orchestra and formed the supergroup Oysterhead, but spent most of 2001 and 2002 working on his solo career. Mike Gordon made two films and an album with guitar legend Leo Kottke. Jon Fishman toured with both the Jazz Mandolin Project and Pork Tornado. Page McConnell formed the electronic trio Vida Blue.

In late 2002, Phish reunited in the Vermont mountains and recorded a brand new studio album, Round Room, the first Phish album since Lawn Boy in 1990 to feature a number of extended jams. The band soon announced that their hiatus was over and that they would be returning to the road in 2003, starting with a New Year's Eve concert on December 31, 2002, at Madison Square Garden. The New Year's run was a three night stand at the Hampton Coliseum in early January.

After appearing on the front cover of Rolling Stone, the band launched their first winter tour of the US since 1993. The brief tour was only two weeks long. The band launched a US summer tour in July that culminated in another festival in upstate Maine. 60,000 people attended the It festival which featured seven sets of Phish music over two nights, including a set performed live from the very top of an air traffic control tower. A DVD film and PBS special was made to document the festival.

It was the sixth festival hosted by the band. The event took place on August 2 and 3, 2003, at the Loring Air Force Base in Limestone, Maine, just miles from the Canada–U.S. border. 60,000 people attended, resulting in one of the largest Phish concerts ever.  This was also their most-played festival venue (see also the Great Went and Lemonwheel). PBS was on hand to make a documentary of the experience.

Phish was the only band at the event, performing seven sets of music over two nights, including a late night ambient set on top of the air traffic control tower at 2:30 AM after the first night's concert. Fans camped onsite in tents, creating a community of Phans that became one of the largest cities in Maine over the weekend.

Phish played only sporadically after the summer tour, including a brief four night run in late November/early December to celebrate their 20th anniversary. The third night of the celebration featured an appearance from founding Phish guitarist Jeff Holdsworth, who had not played onstage with Phish in over 17 years. The group closed out the year with a four night New Year's Eve run in Miami, featuring a surprise appearance from Parliament/Funkadelic.

Original song debuts in 2003 included "Round Room", "Thunderhead", "Mexican Cousin", "Pebbles and Marbles", "Anything But Me", "Seven Below", "Mock Song", "Friday", "Spices", "Scents and Subtle Sounds", "Discern", "Secret Smile", "Two Versions of Me", "Army of One", "Spread it Round", and "Crowd Control."

2004
After a three-night stand in Las Vegas in mid-April, Trey Anastasio announced on the band's website that Phish was officially breaking up for good following a brief summer tour. However, the band continued to debut new material throughout the year, opening their farewell tour with a new song titled "A Song I Heard the Ocean Sing" from their final album Undermind, which was released shortly after the breakup announcement. The tour's opening night was also broadcast in movie theaters across the country and eventually released on DVD and CD as Phish: Live in Brooklyn. The band also debuted another original in Brooklyn titled "Nothing", and the band's final original debut, "Access Me", was unveiled on June 26 at a show in Wisconsin.

On 21 June, Phish appeared on Late Show With David Letterman, performing atop the outside marquee. For the broadcast, Phish performed "Scents And Subtle Sounds" (sans intro) and then they went on to play a short set, featuring truncated versions of several of their songs, for the few hundred fans gathered below.

After a brief run of shows in June (June 18 included an appearance from Jay-Z), the band took most of the summer off before returning for a final week of concerts in August. While the June performances featured an inspired band, eager to put an exclamation point on their career, the August leg of the tour was marred by major crowd control issues, high emotions, and notoriously sloppy performances.

Coventry was a seventh weekend-long festival hosted by the band and was announced to be the final performances ever by the band. The event took place from August 13–15, 2004, at the Newport State Airport in the small town of Coventry, Vermont. An estimated 65,000-68,000 attended. Phish was the only band at the event, performing six sets of music over two nights that were the band's final live performances, until their 2009 reunion. Fans camped on site in tents, creating a community that became the largest city in Vermont over the weekend.

2009
On October 1, 2008, Phish announced a three-show reunion concert at the Hampton Coliseum in Hampton, Virginia.  The shows took place 6–8 March 2009. During the second phase of the band's career, their lack of practice had made it impossible for them to perform the complicated "Fluffhead", much to the chagrin of fans. Fittingly, the first song Phish played upon their return was "Fluffhead", which was met with thunderous applause.

Proving that the Hampton shows were not a one-off, Phish went on to perform fifteen concerts in June 2009, including two days at Bonnaroo Music Festival. The shows kicked off with the band's first ever performance at Boston's Fenway Park and wrapped up at Alpine Valley in East Troy, Wisconsin on June 20–21. During these dates, several new songs were debuted, as the band was working on their eleventh album, Joy. These shows marked a return to song-based performance, as the band initially steered away from extended improvisation. The result would be some of the band's longest setlists since the early 1990s.

On March 17, 2009, Phish announced another dozen dates as a late summer tour, with a four-night stand in Red Rocks Amphitheatre (their first shows there since being banned in 1996), and ending at the Saratoga Performing Arts Center in New York on August 16.

In September, Phish's reunion album, Joy, was released on the band's own label, JEMP Records. Produced by Steve Lillywhite, the album featured the songs that the band had premiered over the course of the summer. A limited edition boxed set version of Joy was packaged with a bonus album called Party Time which featured several outtakes from Joy as well as a some older rarities and solo recordings. Several of the songs from this set made it to the Phish stage and eventually this was released as its own vinyl set.

On June 26, 2009, the band announced a "save the date" for a three-day festival on October 30 - November 1.  Phish.com contained an animated map of the United States, and individual states were slowly removed from the map, leaving California.  Confirming several rumors, the band announced that "Festival 8" would take place at the Empire Polo Fields in Indio, California.  The band played eight sets over the three nights, including a musical costume on Halloween, the Rolling Stones's "Exile On Main Street" and an all acoustic set "at the crack of noon" the following day. Before the acoustic set, the crowd was served free coffee and figure-8-shaped donuts. The festival was filmed in HD 3D and portions of the festival were released in movie theaters across the United States as "Phish 3D." Members of the band Sharon Jones & the Dap-Kings joined the band on Halloween night to perform a number of songs."They were just as nervous as we were. When we stepped up there and did the first two songs—the first one was "Tumbling Dice," and the other one was "Sweet Virginia"—Trey looked up at us after we got through the first song and he gave us a wink," Jones said

On October 9, 2009, Phish announced they would embark on a Fall tour (their first since 2000, just prior to the first hiatus) beginning on November 18 in Detroit, Michigan and concluding on December 5 in Charlottesville, Virginia.  This 13 show tour included two-night stands at the U.S. Bank Arena in Cincinnati, Ohio, the Wachovia Center in Philadelphia, Pennsylvania, and Times Union Center in Albany, New York as well as a three night stand and return to Madison Square Garden (their first shows there since the New Year's Eve 2002 show that ended the first hiatus).

On December 28, 2009, Phish once again returned to Miami, Florida after six years for four days of music, culminating with New Year's Eve on December 31.

Original songs debuted in 2009 include "Backwards Down the Number Line", "Beauty of a Broken Heart", "Undermind", "Ocelot", "Light", "Time Turns Elastic", "Stealing Time From the Faulty Plan", "Kill Devil Falls", "Twenty Years Later", "Let Me Lie", "Sugar Shack", "Joy", "Alaska", "The Connection", "Windy City", "Party Time", "I Been Around", "Invisible", "Sleep Again", "Tomorrow's Song", and "Gone."

Costumes
Leading up to Festival 8, the band's festival which took place over the weekend of Halloween, the band's website featured a gallery of various albums which were narrowed down to twelve by the week before the festival.

The entire gallery of costume choices can be accessed here: Festival 8 Countdown

These final eight albums' titles provided the names of the eight campsites on the festival grounds:
David Bowie – Hunky Dory
Genesis – The Lamb Lies Down on Broadway
The Jimi Hendrix Experience – Electric Ladyland
King Crimson – Larks' Tongues in Aspic
MGMT – Oracular Spectacular
Prince – Purple Rain
Radiohead – Kid A
The Rolling Stones – Exile on Main St.

On October 31, the only album cover that did not have an axe or a knife through it in the gallery on the website was Exile on Main St., which the band played in its entirety later that night

2010s

2010
On 15 March, Trey Anastasio inducted Genesis into the Rock and Roll Hall of Fame. Genesis did not perform, so Phish played in their honor, taking on "Watcher of the Skies" and "No Reply At All", the latter featuring a horn section. This occasion was the only instance of Phish performing these songs.

On 13 May, Phish appeared on Late Night With Jimmy Fallon, who was devoting a week to artists covering songs from Exile On Main Street. Phish performed "Loving Cup" as well as their own "Kill Devil Falls".

Spring 2010, Phish announced a 29-date summer tour. It consisted of a return to Chicago, Hartford, Saratoga, Columbia, Noblesville, East Troy, Jones Beach, and Mansfield. They also played 2 shows at Town Park in Telluride, Colorado. That followed a 3 night run at The Greek Theater in Berkeley, California. It was Phish's first time back there since 1993.

Phish played a 2-hour set at the Austin City Limits festival in Austin, Texas this October.

In the fall, Phish played a 14 date tour. The tour started with a 3 night run in Broomfield, Colorado. Followed by 2 shows in North Charleston, South Carolina. On the release date of Mike Gordon new solo album "Moss", Phish played The Augusta Civic Center in Maine. The smallest venue played on the tour was The Utica Memorial Auditorium in Utica, New York. Then for the first time since 1999 they made a return to Providence, Rhode Island. Then north to Amherst, Massachusetts, the band played 2 nights at the UMASS Mullins Center, which was the first time back since 1995. Then to finish the tour was one show in Manchester NH, first time back since 1994 and then a sold out 3-night Halloween Run at Boardwalk Hall in Atlantic City.

The New Year's run was announced as a 5-date tour starting with two shows in Worcester, Massachusetts. Then a 3-night sold-out run at Madison Square Garden on 12/30, 12/31, 1/1/11.

Songs debuted this year include "Show Of Life", "Idea", "Summer Of '89", "Halfway To The Moon", "Dr. Gabel", "Pigtail", "The Birdwatcher", and "Burn That Bridge".

Costumes
On Halloween night 2010, Phish chose Little Feat's 1978 live album Waiting for Columbus.

2011
The first leg of the Summer 2011 tour was announced in February with more dates announced in April. It began in late May with a three-night run in Bethel and moved on to visit Holmdel for two nights, Clarkston, Cuyahoga Falls, Cincinnati, Mansfield, Darien Center, Camden, 2 nights in Columbia, 2 nights in Alpharetta, Charlotte, Raleigh, and Portsmouth.

Super Ball IX took place at the Watkins Glen International in Watkins Glen, New York on July 1–3, 2011. It was the first concert to take place at Watkins Glen International since Summer Jam at Watkins Glen in 1973. Seven official sets were played throughout the weekend on the festival's main stage. In addition to the official sets, one additional set featuring ambient, avant-garde music similar to the IT Festival Tower Jam was performed. The set was played late Saturday evening from a partially hidden stage contained in a self-storage building that had been constructed as a piece of the festival's various art installations.
The second leg of the 2011 Summer tour was centered around the west coast. Its shows included a two night run in at the Gorge Amphitheatre in George, Phish's first show at the Hollywood Bowl in Los Angeles, and a two night run at Harveys Outdoor Arena in Stateline.

Phish played 2 sets at the Outside Lands Music and Arts Festival in Golden Gate Park in San Francisco.

The band went on to close the summer with 3 night runs at the UIC Pavilion in Chicago, and Dick's Sporting Goods Park in Commerce City over Labor Day Weekend, the latter of which would become a longstanding tradition. Another tradition regarding the Dick's shows, at least for the first few years, was the band's playfulness with at least one of the setlists during the run. In this particular case, every song the band performed on 2 September began with the letter "S".

Phish's home state of Vermont suffered much destruction from flooding after Hurricane Irene made landfall in the northeast. Phish paid tribute by performing a special show on 14 September, in Essex Junction at the Champlain Valley Exposition. All of the money raised from the event went to relief efforts for the state. The show featured a special appearance from Vermont's Governor, Peter Shumlin.

The year for the band closed with a four night New Year's run at Madison Square Garden on December 28, 29, 30, and 31.

Songs debuted this year include "Steam", "Susskind Hotel", and "Babylon Baby".

Box office score data

2012
Phish took most of 2012 to focus on other activities and limited the band's touring to two summer legs and a New Year's run.

The first summer leg ran from early June through early July and focused on the east coast, including stops at Bonnaroo Music and Arts Festival and three nights at Bader Field, in Atlantic City. Other dates include two nights in Portsmouth, Cincinnati, Burgettstown, Cuyahoga Falls, 2 dates in Noblesville, 2 nights in East Troy, a 2 night Fourth of July run in Wantagh, and 3 nights in Saratoga Springs.

The second portion of the tour ventured away from the northeast with dates in Long Beach, 3 nights in San Francisco, Kansas City, Pelham, Atlanta, Charlotte, St. Louis, Oklahoma City (Phish's first performance in Oklahoma,) and another 3 night run over Labor Day Weekend at Dick's Sporting Goods Park in Commerce City. In keeping with the playful setlist tradition, the first letter of each song played at the 31 August show spelled out "Fuck Your Face", before the band ended the second set with the song of the same name.

There were no Phish shows played in the fall, so the next shows were a four-night New Year's run at Madison Square Garden, the culmination of which involved a golf theme (in honor of Page's impending 50th birthday, the joke being that he would retire to the golf course), including an onstage driving range (where the band and crew would launch commemorative golf balls into the crowd), a live runaway golf cart marathon on stage, and several songs in the third set that utilize golf terminology, such as "Iron Man", "Fly Like An Eagle", "Sand", "The Wedge", and "Driver", among others.

This year is uncharacteristic in that no new original material was debuted on stage.

2013
2013 featured no touring until July, as the band was in the studio writing and rehearsing the material that would eventually become their next album. The entire tour routing of Summer 2013 was announced in March. The first show of the year featured the band's first performance at the Waterfront Pavilion in Bangor, Maine. On the heels of this opening show was a three-night run at the Saratoga Performing Arts Center in Saratoga Springs, New York. The tour was scheduled to continue with the band's first performance in Canada in thirteen years, at the Molson Canadian Amphitheatre in Toronto, however an abnormal amount of rainfall the day prior to the show forced the band to postpone, citing lack of power and public access to the venue. The routing continued onto Holmdel, New Jersey, Wantagh, New York, two performances in Columbia, Maryland, two performances in Alpharetta, Georgia, three performances at the Charter One Pavilion in Chicago, two performances at The Gorge Amphitheatre in Washington, two shows in Stateline, Nevada along Lake Tahoe, three shows in the Bill Graham Civic Auditorium in San Francisco, California, and a show at the Hollywood Bowl in Los Angeles.

After the show in Los Angeles, the band took a monthlong break before returning to the stage for their third annual three-night run at Dick's Sporting Goods Park in Commerce City, Colorado over Labor Day Weekend. Continuing with the playful setlists, the first night at Dick's featured a setlist where the first letter of each song, when read in reverse order, spelled "Most Shows Spell Something".

Phish returned to the road for a Fall tour that kicked off with three shows at Hampton Coliseum and then moved its way up the east coast before settling in Atlantic City for a three-night affair at Boardwalk Hall that included the band's 7th Halloween show to feature a musical costume.

Rather than covering another band on Halloween, however, Phish chose to perform the entirety of its own forthcoming album (at the time it was known as Wingsuit) before going into the studio to record it in November. None of this material had been performed by Phish prior to this date, with only "Winterqueen" having been played by Trey's solo band. Most of this material, along with other songs, became the band's Bob Ezrin-produced 12th studio album, Fuego, released in 2014.

Phish capped off 2013 with a four-show run at Madison Square Garden that led up to a New Year's Eve performance that celebrated the band's 30th anniversary. The second set featured the band performing on top of a replica of their first van, adorned with the JEMP logo, which was driven into the middle of the venue floor. Using hockey sticks for mic stands (a nod to their first-ever show), Phish performed a set of songs that dated from their early touring years (no songs newer than 1991 were played in this set). Video montages were screened during the evening and, at one point, cake was served.

Songs debuted this year include "Yarmouth Road", "Architect", "Frost", "Say Something", "Wingsuit", "Fuego", "The Line", "Sing Monica", "Waiting All Night", "Wombat", "Snow", "Devotion To A Dream", "555", "Winterqueen", "Amidst The Peals Of Laughter", and "You Never Know".

2014
April 2014 saw Phish return to the New Orleans Jazz & Heritage Festival for a headlining performance.

Phish's 12th studio album, Fuego, was released on 24 June. That same day, the band appeared on Late Show with David Letterman where they performed "The Line" as well as an additional full set of songs that was later broadcast on the web series Live on Letterman.

The majority of July and August found the band on the road, performing multi-night stops in Saratoga Springs, Philadelphia, Columbia MD, Portsmouth VA, New York's Randalls Island, and Northerly Island in Chicago, as well as several single-night stops, before winding it all up at their annual three-night stand at Dick's Sporting Goods Park, in Commerce City CO.

Continuing their tradition of performing a crafty setlist at the Dick's shows, the first ten songs of the first night's set spelled out "Lushington", which is a title of a very short-lived Phish song from the 1980s, one that has not been played since, and one that has gained almost mythical status. Earlier that year, Rolling Stone conducted a reader's poll to rank the Phish songs in order and there was a fan campaign to stuff the ballot box for "Lushington", in hopes that perhaps the band would play it. The campaign worked and the song appeared in the #1 slot, despite it being one of the most obscure songs in their catalogue. Upon the setlist spelling out the song title, it was expected that the band would perform the song, however, they continued on with "Ha Ha Ha" instead. To date, "Lushington" remains on the shelf.

Phish returned to the road in October, playing a series of shows that concluded with a three-night Halloween run in Las Vegas. For their musical costume this year, Phish utilized the 1964 Disney sound effects album, Chilling, Thrilling Sounds of the Haunted House, as the basis for an elaborate stage show that featured several brand-new instrumental songs, a graveyard-themed stage set, dancing zombies, a narrating crypt-keeper named "Esther", and a haunted house, inside of which they performed the first two numbers before "exploding" to reveal the four members of Phish in white tuxedoes and zombie makeup. That this all occurred in between two otherwise normal Phish sets, in their normal clothes and without the stage props or even a word of acknowledgement, made this set even more of a shock and this is routinely considered one of the band's greatest achievements. Several of the instrumentals as well as the sound effects from this show went on to become fixtures of the band's live rotation, most notably "Martian Monster", "Your Pet Cat", and "The Dogs".

The Vegas run concluded on 2 November, which was also the last date of the fall tour. The band capped off 2014 with a New Year's run in Miami, this time commencing on New Year's Eve.

Songs debuted this year include "Plasma", "The Haunted House", "The Very Long Fuse", "The Dogs", "Timber", "Your Pet Cat", "Shipwreck", "Chinese Water Torture", "The Birds", and "Martian Monster".

2015
2015 kicked off with the last three shows of a four-show New Year's run in Miami.

On March 18, 2015, Phish announced their tenth festival named Magnaball. The festival was once again held at Watkins Glen International in Watkins Glen, NY, and took place August 21–23, 2015. Seven official sets of music were played over three nights. An additional set was played late Saturday night behind a large drive-in movie screen installed on the back of the race track's bleachers. This set featured ambient music and projections on the screen with live videos of the band superimposed. The event's soundcheck was publicly broadcast.

For the fifth year in a row, Phish returned to Dick's Sporting Goods Park, in Commerce City CO, for a three-night Labor Day run. Continuing the tradition of performing a clever setlist, the songs from the extended encore on the third night spelled out "Thank You". While the band would continue their Dick's run in the years that followed, this was the last occurrence of the setlist tradition.

After taking the autumn off, Phish reconvened at Madison Square Garden for a four-night Holiday Run that began on 30 December and concluded on 2 January 2016.

Songs debuted this year include "Shade", "No Men In No Man's Land", "Blaze On", "How Many People Are You", "Scabbard", "Heavy Rotation", "Mercury", "The Last Step", and "Can't Always Listen".

2016
Phish began 2016 right where the previous year had left off....with two shows at Madison Square Garden. Two weeks later, Phish performed their first-ever shows in Mexico, with a three-night destination performance at the Riviera Maya resort. As the band were performing right by the water, several nautical-themed songs made appearances throughout the run, including "A Song I Heard The Ocean Sing", "Prince Caspian", "Free", "Theme From The Bottom", "Drowned", "Sand", "Wading In The Velvet Sea", and others, while the third night's encore was a cover of Led Zeppelin's "The Ocean".

Phish's summer tour began in St. Paul, Minnesota, on 22 June and continued towards the east coast, including two nights at Wrigley Field, before heading west and wrapping up in Chula Vista, California, on 23 July. In August, the band made their first appearance at Lockn' Festival, headlining on the 26th and 28th, before making their way out to their annual Labor Day run at Dick's Sporting Goods Park, in Commerce City CO. For the first time since they began this run, in 2011, the band did not incorporate a cleverly-written setlist into one of the shows.

7 October 2016 saw the release of Phish's 13th studio album, Big Boat. Produced by Bob Ezrin, this album featured several songs that had been debuted in the prior two years and included writing and vocal contributions from all four members of the band. The occasion of this release was marked with an appearance on the Tonight Show, on 10 October, where the band performed "Breath And Burning" and "Blaze On".  Four days later, the band embarked on a 12 date fall tour that began in Charleston, South Carolina, and landed in Las Vegas, for a four-night Halloween run. Between those stops, the band performed in Jacksonville, Florida, two nights in Nashville TN (the first of which featured Bob Weir on most of the second set), two nights in Alpharetta GA, and two nights in Grand Prairie TX.

The band's musical costume at this year's Halloween show was The Rise and Fall of Ziggy Stardust and the Spiders from Mars, by the late David Bowie (who had died earlier that year). Augmented by horns and a string sextet, the band ably paid tribute to their fallen hero. "Rock And Roll Suicide" was performed with Trey on lead vocals, crooner style, with no guitar – the only time in his career that he has performed in such a way.

Phish capped off 2016 with four shows at Madison Square Garden, culminating in a New Year's Eve third set that featured the horns from the Trey Anastasio Band for the duration of the set, as well as stage dancers for the New Year's gag, which was based on the song, "Petrichor", and its "rain" theme.

Songs debuted this year include "Miss You", "Breath And Burning", "Things People Do", "Waking Up Dead", "Friends", "Let's Go", "Ass Handed", "Petrichor", "Home", "More", "I Always Wanted It This Way", and "Running Out Of Time".

2017
Phish began 2017 with a three-night destination show at the Barceló Maya Beach resort, in Playa del Carmen, Mexico, which ran from 13 to 15 January.

Phish's summer tour in 2017 was a rather unconventional one and began with three nights at Chicago's Northerly Island, followed by isolated one-night performances in Fairborn and Pittsburgh, before the band got down to business.

Keen to stay off the road as much as possible, Phish instead booked thirteen consecutive shows at Madison Square Garden. Known as the "Baker's Dozen", the shows ran from 21 July through 6 August. Partnering with Philadelphia's independent Federal Donuts, the band created a different theme for each night's show, based on the various flavors of donuts, and those who got in the door early were treated to a sample of that night's flavor. The shows' themes were as follows: Coconut, Strawberry, Red Velvet, Jam-Filled, Powdered, Chocolate, Cinnamon, Jimmies, Maple, Donut Holes, Lemon, Boston Cream, and Pink Glazed. Each night's setlist would tie in to the flavor somewhat, with both existing and newly learned songs making appearances (for example, the band performed Shuggie Otis' "Strawberry Letter 23" on "strawberry" night). Many of the shows would begin with a cover song performed a cappella, and it became a guessing game as to what songs may appear in a given night. Another feature of the Baker's Dozen was that, over the course of thirteen shows, Phish did not repeat a single song, performing 237 unique songs over the course of 26 sets of music, and they performed without any special guests.

For their efforts, and because of the sheer number of times Phish has sold out the venue, Madison Square Garden installed a banner that commemorates the Baker's Dozen, which hangs in the arena with the other championship banners.

For the seventh consecutive year, Phish returned to Dick's Sporting Goods Park, in Commerce City CO, for their annual Labor Day run. Once again foregoing the clever setlist game, the shows were heavy on improvisation and the result of a band still riding the momentum of the Baker's Dozen.

Phish concluded 2017 with a "long-awaited triumphant return" to Madison Square Garden for a four-show run that concluded on New Year's Eve. The gag this year was based on an aquatic theme, laid out in the song, "Soul Planet" (which was debuted that evening). The stage was transformed into a pirate ship, with sails, cannons, and a Phish-themed jolly roger flag. Audience members were given glowing bracelets that made the venue look like the sea. The remainder of the show contained songs that feature nautical themes.

Songs debuted this year include "Everything's Right", "Leaves", "Love Is What We Are", "Corona", "Thread", "Tuesday", "Crazy Sometimes", "Marissa", "Rise/Come Together", "End Of Session", "Sunshine Of Your Feeling", "Most Events Aren't Planned", and "Soul Planet".

2018

2019

2020s

2020

2021

2022

Box office score data

2023

Musical costumes 
Musical costume is a term for the band Phish's elaborate Halloween concerts that involved the band performing an entire album by another artist and including it as the second of three sets. For the 1994 and 1995 Halloween shows, Phish fans were able to vote via newsletter for their choice in which album was to be played. Fans were invited to wear Halloween costumes and take part in costume contests and were given a "Phishbill" which identify the album and the band's relationship to it. Nine official musical costumes have been played by Phish to-date, plus one surprise performance of Pink Floyd's The Dark Side of the Moon on November 2, 1998—just two days after the band performed the music of the Velvet Underground.  The band has played a total of sixteen times on Halloween night: 1986, 1987, 1989, 1990, 1991, 1994, 1995, 1996, 1998, 2009, 2010, 2013, 2014, 2016, 2018, and 2021 with special audience participation costume contests being a part of the 1990, 1994, and 2010 shows.

During their comeback year of 2009, Phish performed the Rolling Stones' album Exile on Main Street as part of Phish Festival 8 at Indio, California. In 2010, they covered Little Feat's album Waiting For Columbus in Atlantic City, New Jersey. Four of the Halloween shows have been released in their entirety as a part of the Live Phish Series; 1994's Live Phish Volume 13, which included the cover of the Beatles' White Album; Live Phish 14, which included the 1995 cover of the Who's Quadrophenia; Live Phish 15, which included the 1996 cover of Talking Heads' Remain in Light, and Live Phish 16, which included the 1998 cover of The Velvet Underground's Loaded. Phish has also released the Halloween shows from 1991, 2009, 2010, 2013, 2014, and 2016 separately via their Livephish website.

List of musical costumes
 1994: The Beatles by the Beatles
 1995: Quadrophenia by the Who
 1996: Remain in Light by Talking Heads
 1998: Loaded by the Velvet Underground and The Dark Side of the Moon by Pink Floyd
 2009: Exile on Main Street by the Rolling Stones
 2010: Waiting for Columbus by Little Feat
 2013: Wingsuit (later retitled Fuego) by Phish
 2014: Chilling, Thrilling Sounds of the Haunted House by Walt Disney Records and Laura Olsher
 2016: The Rise and Fall of Ziggy Stardust and the Spiders from Mars by David Bowie
 2018: í rokk by Kasvot Vaxt (new material by Phish disguised as an obscure album by a fictional 1980s progressive rock band from Scandinavia)
 2021: Get More Down by Sci-Fi Soldier (new material by Phish presented as material by a futuristic rock band from the year 4680)

Tickets by Mail
Phish Tickets By Mail (or PTBM) was a service that sold tickets to performances by Phish before their general on-sale date through Ticketmaster and other traditional ticketing outlets.  The service exists today in a limited form for concerts involving Trey Anastasio, Mike Gordon, Page McConnell and Jon Fishman. Beginning in the mid-1990s, the Phish ticket presale was done through mail order. For each Phish tour (starting with "taper only" tickets for the December 1994 New Years Run, and both taper and regular tickets for Summer Tour 1995) specific instructions for mail order were listed in the band's newsletter, "Doniac Schvice" (and, later, Phish.com), usually involving envelopes of a specified size, postcards and return postage in the event the ticket order was not fulfilled. There were very specific details that needed to be done, in an effort to deter scalpers and ticket brokers. The ticket orders were then outsourced to a business to fulfill the orders.  In the final years of the mail order process, ticket orders were processed by the staff at the Flynn Theatre in Burlington, Vermont. The order in which ticket requests were fulfilled was random, and no seniority or special treatment was given to any fan. These tickets were printed in limited amounts on colored paper with foil and some sort of design, and only issued through mail order.

In 2001, while Phish was on a hiatus, Trey Anastasio booked a tour of amphitheatres and major venues. It was his largest tour, at the time, without Phish. With Phish's management, Dionysian Productions scaled down during the hiatus, Anastasio and Dionysian used an internet-based ticket presale service run by Musictoday, who has been running a similar service for Dave Matthews Band's Warehouse Fan Association since 1999. Instead of fans filling out postcards, they went to a website, requested shows and put in credit card information. For this tour, the orders were still processed at the Flynn Theatre. This would be the last tour where PTBM would run from Vermont.

When Trey Anastasio went on tour in 2002, he used the Musictoday service again. However, unlike the 2001 tour, the final processing process took place at Musictoday's home base in Charlottesville, Virginia. Later that year, when Phish announced their return tour, PTBM used that service as well.  All ticket presales for Phish and side projects, from that point on, used Musictoday's online service.

As Phish side-project tours have become smaller following Phish's 2004 disbandment, most presales have been real-time sales, with a first-come-first-served approach in place of the lotteries employed in Phish's touring heyday. With Phish's return to the stage in 2009, the band is once again using Musictoday's online service.

Commercial reputation 
Phish's 2015 tour prices ranged from US$40.00 – $70.00. Shows with special events attached to them tend to run towards the higher end of the spectrum given that they typically have an extra set of music included in the show.

Sources
The first Phish concert setlist archive was "The Helping Phriendly Book", a section of the fan-based Phish.net website unveiled on the Internet in 1991.  Two books, The Pharmer's Almanac and The Phish Companion, contained detailed collections of Phish setlists, the first appearing in six volumes between 1995 and 2000 and the latter prepared to release a third volume in 2016.

See also
 List of Phish songs

References

Phish
Lists of concert tours